Blessington is a town located in County Wicklow, Ireland. Blessington may also refer to:

Blessington (Parliament of Ireland constituency), a constituency in County Wicklow represented in the Irish House of Commons from 1670 until 1800
Blessington GAA, Gaelic games club in Blessington, County Wicklow
Earl of Blessington, two extinct titles in Ireland
William Stewart, 1st Earl of Blessington (1709–1769), an Anglo-Irish peer and member of the House of Lords
Charles Gardiner, 1st Earl of Blessington (1782–1829), an Irish earl
Marguerite Gardiner, Countess of Blessington (1789–1849), an Irish novelist and wife of the earl
James Blessington (1874-1939), a Scottish football player and manager
Viscount Blesington, a title in the Peerage of Ireland
Murrough Boyle, 1st Viscount Blesington (1648–1718)
Charles Boyle, 2nd Viscount Blesington (d. 1732)
Blessington, Ontario, a community in the township of Tyendinaga, Ontario
Blessington, Tasmania, a locality in Australia
Blessington Lake, a reservoir and conservation area in west County Wicklow, Ireland
 Dublin and Blessington Steam Tramway, a steam-powered tram that ran from 1888 until 1932